(also known as Mr. Pig and Pig and Bombers) is a arcade video game developed by NMK and Jaleco and released in 1987. It was ported to the ZX Spectrum, Commodore 64, MSX, and Amstrad CPC by U.S. Gold as Psycho Pigs U.X.B.

Gameplay

The player controls a pig and the aim of the game is to blow up other pigs by throwing bombs at them. The bombs are randomly spawned across the map and can be picked up and thrown at the other pigs. The bombs are given a number between 5 and 30; when the bomb is thrown it takes that number of seconds to explode. Bombs which directly hit pigs explode on contact. Various power ups are available throughout the game such as gas that makes all other characters fall asleep.

A bonus sub-game involves random pigs popping out of holes, and the player must knock them back down the hole with their own pig, in a similar mode of gameplay to Whack-a-mole.

Ports 
The game was released on the Nintendo Switch in the Nintendo eShop on 16 May 2019 by Hamster Corporation as part of their Arcade Archives series and also on the PlayStation 4 on 14 July 2015 as part of the same series.

Reception

There were several criticisms of sexism when an advert of the game showing a semi-naked model holding the video game case was published in some specialized magazines.

References

External links

Buta san Arcade Archives page

1987 video games
Arcade video games
Jaleco games
Japan-exclusive video games
ZX Spectrum games
Amstrad CPC games
Commodore 64 games
MSX games
Nintendo Switch games
PlayStation 4 games
PlayStation Network games
X68000 games
Fictional pigs
U.S. Gold games
Video games about pigs
Video games developed in Japan
Video games scored by Tim Follin
Hamster Corporation games